María de los Angeles González Tuarez (born 28 March 1982 in Guatire, Miranda) is a retired Venezuelan athlete who specialised in the javelin throw. She represented her country at the 2008 Summer Olympics failing to qualify for the final.

Her personal best in the event is 54.75 metres, set in 2008. This is the current national record.

Competition record

References

1982 births
Living people
People from Guatire
Venezuelan female javelin throwers
Olympic athletes of Venezuela
Athletes (track and field) at the 2008 Summer Olympics
Central American and Caribbean Games medalists in athletics
20th-century Venezuelan women
21st-century Venezuelan women